Health in Egypt refers to the overall health of the population of Egypt.

Health infrastructure 
The Egyptian Ministry of Health is the government body responsible for health in Egypt.

Water supply and sanitation 

There are conflicting figures about the number of people with access to safe water, and especially the number of people with access to sanitation. According to the official UN figures used to monitor the achievement of the Millennium Development Goals, 99% of Egyptians had access to an improved water source and 94% had access to improved sanitation in 2008.

Soakaway latrines, which are common in rural areas, often do not work properly due to the high groundwater table, infrequent emptying and cracks in the walls. Thus sewage leaks out and contaminates the surrounding streets, canals, and groundwater. Trucks that empty latrines and septic tanks do not necessarily discharge septage into wastewater treatment plants, but rather dump the content in the environment.

According to the government's National Research Center, 40 percent of Cairo's inhabitants do not get water for more than three hours per day and three large districts do not receive any piped water. In 2008 demonstrations concerning this issue took place in Suez, where 500 people blocked a main road to Cairo. According to a survey carried out prior to 2006 in governorate of Fayoum, 46% of households complained about low water pressure, 30% about frequent water cuts and 22% complained that water is not available during day time. These problems lead many people to use water from canals which could be hazardous to health.

It is estimated that each year about 17,000 children die from diarrhea. One reason is that drinking water quality is often below standards. Some water treatment plants are not maintained properly and are thus inefficient in removing parasites, viruses and other parasitic microorganisms. In 2009, a study by the Ministry of Health showed that drinking water for half a million people in Asiut was unfit for human consumption. As of June 2011, nothing had been done to address the problem. Chlorination systems of wells, which had been installed years ago because high levels of bacteria had been detected in the groundwater, failed for lack of maintenance and have been shut down so that untreated water is provided to the residents.

Health status

Statistic

Life expectancy 
The 2020 average life expectancy in Egypt, estimated by the World Bank Group, was 72.15 years: 69.88 for male and 74.53 for female.

Source: UN World Population Prospects

Infectious diseases 
Egypt used to have high rates of Hepatitis C (22%), one of the highest worldwide (Pakistan (4.8%), China (3.2%)). It is believed that the high prevalence in Egypt is linked to a now-discontinued mass-treatment campaign for schistosomiasis, using improperly sterilized glass syringes. In 2018, the Ministry of Health began a program to screen for and treat HCV. To reach a target population of 62.5 million, residents were screened at multiple healthcare and other sites using a WHO-approved rapid diagnostic test (RDT) that analyzed finger-prick samples for HCV antibodies, Viremic persons received sofosbuvir (400 mg daily) plus daclatasvir (60 mg daily) with or without ribavirin for 12 or 24 weeks, Almost 50 million people (80% of the target population) participated.

Avian influenza has been present in Egypt, with 52 cases and 23 deaths in January 2009.

With an estimated tuberculosis (TB) incidence of 11 new cases per 100,000 people, Egypt has relatively low levels of TB according to 2005 data from the World Health Organization.

HIV/AIDS 

With less than 1 percent of the population estimated to be HIV-positive, Egypt is a low-HIV-prevalence country. Unsafe behaviors among most-at-risk populations and limited condom use among the general population place Egypt at risk of a broader epidemic. According to the National AIDS Program (NAP), there were 1,155 people living with HIV/AIDS (PLWHA) in Egypt by the end of 2007. UNAIDS estimates for 2005 were higher, putting the number of HIV-positive Egyptians at 5,300.

Smoking 

Smoking in Egypt is prevalent, with 19 billion cigarettes smoked annually in Egypt making it the largest cigarette market in the Arab world. Inside cafes, hookah (shisha) smoking is common. As of 2012 smoking in Egypt has reached an all-time high with an estimated twenty percent, ten million people, regularly using tobacco products.

Obesity 

In 1996, Egypt had the highest average BMI in the world at 26.3. In 1998, 1.6% of 2- to 6-year-olds, 4.9% of 6- to 10-year-olds, 14.7% of 10- to 14-year-olds, and 13.4% of 14- to 18-year-olds were obese. 45% of urban women and 20% of the rural population were obese.

Obesity rates rose as oils, fat, and sugars were more regularly consumed, beginning in the 1990s. The cultural appreciation of heavier female bodies is a factor. Another explanation is the degree to which food is the center of social events and special occasions. Heavy consumption of starchy and fatty foods without the presence of a health-conscious exercise culture is a major factor. As parents teach this lifestyle to their children, the prevalence of childhood obesity increases.  Today, Egyptian teenagers drink three times as much soda as milk. Ten percent of males and females drink five or more cans of soda a day, which can lead to early osteoporosis in women in the future. These food habits are reinforced by junk food advertisements and the availability of unhealthy food at supermarkets. As a result, teenagers are three times as likely to be overweight than they were 20 years ago.

Drug use
According to Egypt's National Council for Battling Drug Addiction, the use of recreational drugs among residents of Cairo over the age of 15 has rocketed from 6% to 30% since the Egyptian Revolution of 2011.

Performance
The Human Rights Measurement Initiative found that Egypt was fulfilling 84.9% of what it should be fulfilling for the right to health based on its level of income in 2021. When looking at the right to health with respect to children, it achieves 94.8% of what is expected based on its current income. In regards to the right to health amongst the adult population, the country achieves  88.1% of what is expected based on the nation's level of income.  Egypt falls into the "very bad" category when evaluating the right to reproductive health because the nation is fulfilling only 71.8% of what the nation is expected to achieve based on the resources (income) it has available.

See also
 Healthcare in Egypt

References

External links
 World Health Organization (WHO) - Egypt